Florida Senate Bill 90 (SB 90) is a law in the state of Florida which amends the state's election law.

Background
The coronavirus pandemic meant that the 2020 United States elections had seen high levels of mail-in voting, with up to 46% of voters saying they voted by mail. In Florida, 4.8 million voters chose to vote by mail, with more Democrats voting absentee than Republicans for the first time in several election cycles.

After Joe Biden's victory in the 2020 presidential election. Trump supporters unsuccessfully attempted to overturn the election results. SB 90 is seen to be part of Republican efforts to restrict voting rights following the election.

SB 90 restricts access to mail-in voting as well as limiting the ability of independent organisations to be involved with elections, leading to the Brennan Center for Justice and the NAACP Legal Defense Fund to describe it as a voter suppression measure.

Supporters argue that the law is a preventative measure in order to "restore faith and confidence in elections".

Provisions

General provisions of the act include:
Regulating behaviour of state officials in civil actions which effect Florida's election law:
Making it so that in any litigation challenging the validity of a provision of the Florida Electoral Code in which a Florida government official is a party, the official (or anyone working on their behalf) must communicate in writing details of any proposed settlement to the President of the Florida Senate, Speaker of the Florida House of Representatives and the Florida Attorney General throughout the process.
Compelling state officials or their representatives to 'promptly' move to dismiss cases once the Florida Legislature has amended the law to remove provisions which are rendered invalid or unenforceable by a court ruling.
Prohibiting state agencies from using any donations or personal services for the purpose of funding election-related expenses, voter education, voter outreach or registration programs.
Restoring the former felon declaration of voting eligibility after changes made following Florida Amendment 4's passing in 2018 were overturned by Judge Robert Hinkle.
Adding extra risk assessment requirements for online voter registration systems.
Requiring the Florida Department of Highway Safety and Motor Vehicles to assist the Department of State in identifying voters who have changed their address.

Voter registration
Provisions include:
Amending the regulations governing organizations and their volunteers who promote voter registration:
Clarifying that only volunteers who collect and handle registration applications need to be registered with the voting division, not volunteers who only solicit applications.
Repealing the requirement for volunteers to undertake a sworn statement saying they will obey all state laws regarding voter registration.
Amending requirements for voter registration organizations delivering of applications:
Requiring applications to be submitted to the county in which the applicant lives.
Extending the delivery time requirement from 48 hours after the application was completed by the applicant to 14 days after.
Laying out information that organizations must provide to applicants using their services.

Voting by mail
Provisions included:
Making it a first degree misdemeanor to possess more than two vote-by-mail ballots, not including one's own and those of an immediate family member.
Expanding the definition of "immediate family member" to include grandchildren.
Expanding rules on making duplicates of damaged mail-in ballots during counting:
Requiring duplicates to be made in "an open and accessible room".
Allowing duplicates of over or undervoted mail-in ballots only if there is a clear indication that the voter made a definite choice in that election or ballot measure.
Allowing candidates, party officials or political committee officials to observe the duplication taking place, including the markings made on each ballot.
Requiring duplication to happen in the presence of at least one canvassing board member.
Allowing observers present to make objections to a duplication which, if reasonable, must be presented to the canvassing board which notes the serial number in its minutes and decides on its validity. If valid, it must be counted and if invalid, it must be replaced with another duplication.
Allowing a single request to vote by mail to be sufficient to receive mail-in ballots for all elections until the end of the calendar year of the next regularly scheduled general election.
Allowing requests for mail-in ballots submitted before the act comes into force to stand until the end of 2022.
Reforming methods of requesting a mail-in ballot:
Allowing voters to request to vote by mail in person.
Requiring requests made in person or by telephone to provide a Florida driver's license number, a Florida ID card number or the last four digits of their social security number.
Requiring requests in writing to, in addition to the provision of a form of identification, be signed by the elector.

No-solicitation zones
No-solicitation zones are areas around polling stations where campaigning and political activities are restricted for the duration of an election. Under Florida law, anywhere within  of a polling place, early voting site or election supervisor office is a no-solicitation zone. SB 90 made provision for:
Drop box sites to be added to sites protected by no-solicitation zones
Expands the definition of solicitation to include any activity with the intent to or effect of influencing voters.

Passage
SB 90 was introduced by Republican Dennis Baxley, reviving a similar bill introduced by Jeff Brandes in a past legislative session and building on recent proposals put forward by Florida Governor Ron DeSantis.

Clauses requiring a handwritten signature for mail-in voters (rather than a digital one obtained from the Department of Motor Vehicles' databases) were scrapped after it became a focal point of debate around the bill.

The Florida Senate approved the bill 23-17 on 26 April with Republican Jeff Brandes voting with Democrats against it, before it was sent to the House of Representatives where it was amended and passed 77-40 two days later. The amended bill was passed by the Senate 23-17 and the House 77-40 on the 29 April, the day before the regular session of the legislature ended.

The bill was signed by Governor DeSantis on 6 May in a bill-signing that aired exclusively on Fox News. DeSantis was criticised after other media outlets were neither told about the bill-signing nor allowed in. Fox News released a statement saying that they had not requested that the interview be exclusive, and later said that they had not known that DeSantis would sign the bill on camera. SB 90 came into effect immediately upon signing.

Response

Before becoming law
Lake County Supervisor of Elections Alan Hays said that removing all existing requests for mail-in ballots would "cost the taxpayers of Florida somewhere between $12 and $16 million" and that the legislature should "rethink this". Later, the president of the Florida Supervisors of Elections, Craig Latimer said that the bill "doesn't make any sense" when legislators hadn't cited any instances of fraud that it would prevent.

The ACLU opposed SB 90 from its introduction, stating it would "make it harder for Floridians to cast a ballot by mail".

After becoming law
DeSantis said at the bill-signing that the act would protect the "integrity and transparency" of elections in Florida.

The Brennan Center for Justice called the act an "omnibus voter suppression bill" which was based on "unfounded and unspecified concerns about election integrity". The Florida branch of the ACLU called SB 90 "undemocratic" and accused legislators of "suppressing the right to vote". The President of the Florida branch of the League of Women Voters said that SB 90 shouldn't have "ever been filed as a bill" and that it would disenfranchise the elderly, disabled, students and people of colour.

Michael S. Bennett, the election supervisor for Manatee County, said that while the bill would suppress votes, it is not a voter suppression bill, and that it would cause "additional costs" of between $200,000 and $300,000.

In October 2021, it was reported that a survey of twelve of Florida's 67 election supervisors found an expected combined increase in costs of almost $165,000.

Lawsuits 
Several groups sued the state nine minutes after the bill was signed into law. The Florida branches of the League of Women Voters, Black Voters Matter, and the Alliance for Retired Americans along with three independent voters sued Laurel M. Lee, the Secretary of State of Florida and Ashley Moody, the Florida Attorney General, as well as the Election Supervisors of every county in the state, arguing that the act violated the First and Fourteenth Amendments.

The NAACP, Disability Rights Florida, and Common Cause also filed a suit against Lee the same morning, claiming SB 90 "illegally and unconstitutionally burdens the right to vote".

On May 18, another lawsuit was filed against Lee and Florida's election supervisors by several organisations including UnidosUS and the Hispanic Federation, alleging that SB 90 was racially discriminatory against Black and Latino voters, violating Section 2 of the Voting Rights Act of 1965.

On June 13, the Southern Poverty Law Center and the Fair Elections Center brought another suit against Lee and Moody on behalf of the Harriett Tubman Freedom Fighters and HeadCount to challenge the provision of SB 90 which mandates that third-party organisations conducting voter registration must give a disclaimer warning that they may not deliver applications on time. The suit argues that this "misleading warning" restricts the ability of third-party organisations to engage in advocacy or voter registration efforts, and that it violates the First and Fourteenth Amendments.

All four lawsuits were consolidated for the discovery phase, with League of Women Voters v. Lee named as the 'parent case'. In four rulings in October 2021, Judge Mark Walker allowed the suits to move forward, but dismissed some of the challenges for lack of standing; Walker noted that state attorneys would have been a better target for litigation than the Florida's attorney general. A motion to add Dave Aronberg, the state attorney for Florida's 15th judicial circuit, to League of Women Voters v. Lee as a new defendant was denied on November 4.

In November 2021, Walker allowed the Governor's Office and seven Republican legislators to not testify on the grounds of legislative and executive privilege. The University of Florida initially sought to bar three of its political science professors from testifying, saying that it may be "adverse to the university's interests as a state of Florida institution". The decision was later reversed, but the three professors sued the provost, president and board of trustees of the university for infringing their First Amendment rights.

On March 31, 2022, Walker ruled that SB 90 violated the Voting Rights Act of 1965. Walker issued a permanent injunction against the law’s restrictions on absentee ballot drop boxes and required Florida to obtain preclearance from federal courts before enacting election laws. Florida Governor Ron DeSantis and Attorney General Ashley Moody vowed to appeal the ruling.

See also

Voter suppression in the United States

Notes

References

External links
Text of the legislation as enacted

Florida statutes
United States election law
2021 in American law
2021 in Florida
Voter suppression